Datura is a 2012 first-person adventure game developed by Plastic and published by Sony Computer Entertainment for PlayStation 3.

Gameplay
Datura can be played with either the PlayStation Move or the DualShock 3. The player starts as a patient in an ambulance, from which ends up mysteriously in a forest. The gameplay is built upon the exploration of the forest, where the player can interact with objects and other characters.

Reception

The game received "mixed" reviews according to the review aggregation website Metacritic. IGN praised the atmospheric elements, but criticised the shortness and the clumsiness of the gameplay. GameSpot heavily criticised the shortness and the lack of clarity in the plot. Kotaku commended its originality, yet defined the overall experience of Datura as "confusing, unsatisfying, and ultimately fleeting".

References

External links
 

2012 video games
First-person adventure games
PlayStation 3 games
PlayStation 3-only games
PlayStation Move-compatible games
Sony Interactive Entertainment games
Video games developed in Poland